Poa infirma is a species of grass known by the common names early meadow-grass and weak bluegrass. It was first described from a specimen found in Colombia, but it is actually an introduced species in the Americas and is native to Europe. It grows in many types of habitat, including disturbed areas. It is very similar to Poa annua, which is probably a daughter species, and it is often mistaken for P. annua unless it is closely examined.

It has thin, soft-haired, yellow-green leaves. The inflorescence is a series of branches bearing flattened spikelets which have tufts of curly hairs.

References

Further reading

 Takagi-Arigho, Ray (1994) Poa infirma - Flourishing? ... or Fleeing? BSBI News 65:14-18 (gives details of the plant's status and habitat in southwest England)

External links
Jepson Manual Treatment
USDA Plants Profile

infirma
Flora of Europe
Flora of Western Asia
Flora of China